The 1959 U.S. Women's Open was the 14th U.S. Women's Open, held June 25–27 at Churchill Valley Country Club in Blackridge, Pennsylvania, a suburb east of Pittsburgh. It was the seventh edition conducted by the United States Golf Association (USGA).

Defending champion Mickey Wright won the second of her four U.S. Women's Open titles, two strokes ahead of runner-up Louise Suggs, a two-time champion. Suggs led after 36 holes, but a third round 75 pushed her four strokes back. Wright, age 24, putted well in the final round and was two-under after fifteen holes, but bogeyed the final three. She was the first of seven to successfully defend the championship, last accomplished by Karrie Webb in 2001. It was the third of 13 major championships for Wright.

In this competition, Patty Berg became the first woman to hit a hole-in-one during any USGA competition. 

This was the third major in three years at Churchill Valley, which hosted the LPGA Championship in 1957 and 1958. The club closed in 2013.

Past champions in the field

Source:

Final leaderboard
Saturday, June 27, 1959

Source:

References

External links
USGA final leaderboard
U.S. Women's Open Golf Championship
U.S. Women's Open – past champions – 1959

U.S. Women's Open
Golf in Pittsburgh
Sports competitions in Pennsylvania
U.S. Women's Open
U.S. Women's Open
U.S. Women's Open
U.S. Women's Open
Women's sports in Pennsylvania